The zone libre (free zone) was a partition of the French metropolitan territory during World War II, established at the Second Armistice at Compiègne on 22 June 1940. It lay to the south of the demarcation line and was administered by the French government of Marshal Philippe Pétain based in Vichy, in a relatively unrestricted fashion. To the north lay the zone occupée ("occupied zone") in which the powers of Vichy France were severely limited.

In November 1942, the zone libre was invaded by the German  and Italian armies in Case Anton, as a response to Operation Torch, the Allied landings in North Africa. Thenceforth, the zone libre and zone occupée were renamed the zone sud (southern zone) and zone nord (northern zone) respectively. From then on both were under German military administration.

Origins of the zone libre

On 22 June 1940, after the Battle of France, Marshal Wilhelm Keitel, representing Nazi Germany, and General Charles Huntziger representing Pétain's government, signed an armistice at the Rethondes clearing in the forest of Compiègne, which stipulated in its second article:

The line separating French territory into two zones was defined on a map attached to the treaty. 

This separation line took effect on 25 June 1940. It was thereafter referred to as the ligne de démarcation.

French sovereignty persisted throughout the whole territory, including the zone occupée, Alsace and Moselle, but the terms of the armistice in its third article stipulated that Germany would exercise the rights of an occupying power in the zone occupée.

When the Allies invaded North Africa on 8 November 1942, the Germans and Italians immediately occupied the remaining free part of France. After being renamed zone sud ("south zone"), it was thereafter ruled by the Wehrmacht as a part of occupied France.

The liberation of France began on 6 June 1944 with the Allied forces landing on D-Day, the Battle of Normandy, and the Allied landing in Provence on August 15th. Most of France was liberated by September 1944.

Extent of the zone libre
The ligne de démarcation passed through 13 of the 90 departments:

 Basses-Pyrénées (Pyrénées-Atlantiques since 1969)
 Landes
 Gironde
 Dordogne
 Charente
 Vienne
 Indre-et-Loire
 Loir-et-Cher
 Cher
 Allier
 Saône-et-Loire
 Jura
 Ain

Of the other 77 departments, 42 lay entirely within the zone libre and 35 lay entirely within the zone occupée.

Theories about the separation of the zones
For the historian Éric Alary, the partitioning of France into two main zones, libre and occupée, was partly inspired by the fantasy of pan-Germanist writers, particularly a work by a certain Adolf Sommerfeld, published in 1912 and translated into French under the title Le Partage de la France, which contained a map showing a France partitioned between Germany and Italy according to a line which partly matched that of 1940.

Henry Espieux [fr] suggests: "During the occupations, the Franks were separated from the Occitans by the famous demarcation line. We have long thought that the route of this line was suggested to Hitler by the romance language specialists in his entourage."

Jews in the free zone 

Though the free zone was not under direct Nazi control from 1940 to 1942, many of the laws made in these years mirrored the policies of Nazi Germany and German-occupied France despite their completely French origin.

The Law on the status of Jews was signed by Pétain on 3 October 1940, three months after the zone libre was formed. These laws barred Jews from many aspects of daily life including work and naturalization as French citizens. Jews' new classification as foreign made them more at risk for harsh punishment as “foreigners” rather than citizens. House arrest or being arrested and placed into one of the internment camps in France was a common fate. Breaking any French law or anti-Jewish statute could lead to their expulsion if accused by a neighbor or officer.

Official justification for the laws varied slightly but held with the top-down anti-Semitism characteristic of the Vichy government at this time. The General Commission on Jewish Affairs stated plainly that these laws were justified in their moral humiliation of Jews and were completely of French origin. The narrative of Jews in France being parasitic was pushed by Vichy France in official statements but was relatively subdued until the last six months of the  when outright antisemitism became a fundamental aspect of Vichy policy.

Free zone and Italy

On 24 June 1940, two days after the armistice with Germany, the Vichy government signed an armistice with the Italians at the villa Incisa in Olgiata near Rome, instituting a zone of Italian occupation. The Italian occupation zone concerned certain border areas conquered by Italian troops, including Menton. This zone was of limited importance, comprising  and 28,000 inhabitants. Four departments were partially covered by the Italian occupation: Alpes-Maritimes, Basses-Alpes (Alpes-de-Haute-Provence since 1970), Hautes-Alpes and Savoie.

In addition, a demilitarised zone was established containing all French territory within  from the zone of Italian occupation. The department of Corsica (split into two departments since 1976) was neither occupied nor demilitarized by any provision of the armistice (although it was occupied by Italy after Case Anton).

End of the free zone
On 8 November 1942 Allied forces invaded French North Africa (Operation Torch). German and Italian forces responded on 11 November 1942 by invading the zone libre in Case Anton (based on a previous plan called Operation Attila, which had not included any Italian forces). The zone libre became the zone sud (south zone) from November 1942 onwards; the invading powers shared out its territory between themselves, with a region covering practically the whole area east of the Rhône passing to the Italians.
After the capitulation of Italy at Cassibile became public knowledge on 8 September 1943, the Italian armies retreated and the Germans united the southern zone under their own exclusive control. The German military administration in France ruled both zone sud and zone nord; the Vichy regime remained nominally in charge, as it had in the zone occupée.

Other names
Until November 1942, the Germans called the zone libre "Unbesetztes Gebiet" or unoccupied zone. The zone libre was also nicknamed the zone nono by the French, shortened from non occupée (unoccupied). The occupied zone accordingly became the zone jaja (yes-yes zone). The zone libre was also called the royaume du maréchal (Marshal Philippe Pétain's kingdom) by the French author Jacques Delperrié de Bayac.

References

Military history of France during World War II
Former subdivisions of France
1940 establishments in France
1942 disestablishments in France
States and territories established in 1940
States and territories disestablished in 1942
Axis powers